Daniélou is a surname. Notable people with the surname include:

 Alain Daniélou (1907–1994), French historian, intellectual, musicologist and Indologist
 Charles Daniélou (1878–1953), French politician who was Minister of the Merchant Marine in 1930–1931 
 Jean Daniélou (1905–1974), theologian, historian, cardinal and a member of the Académie française
 Yann Daniélou (born 1966) is a retired French football defender